4337 Arecibo is a binary Themistian asteroid from the outer regions of the asteroid belt, approximately  in diameter. It was discovered on 14 April 1985, by American astronomer Edward Bowell at the Anderson Mesa Station near Flagstaff, Arizona, in the United States. It was named after the Arecibo Observatory in Puerto Rico. It has a relatively large minor-planet moon that was discovered in stellar occultation observations by David Gault and Peter Nosworthy in May 2021, distinguishing it as the first asteroid moon discovered and confirmed solely using the occultation method.

History

Discovery 
This asteroid was discovered by American astronomer Edward Bowell while measuring a pair of images taken with the Lowell Observatory's 0.33-meter astrograph on 14 April 1985, located at the Anderson Mesa Station near Flagstaff, Arizona, in the United States. The discovery observations were published by the Minor Planet Center on 4 May 1985. In September 1985, astronomers Kiichirō Furukawa and Lutz D. Schmadel both identified the asteroid in prediscovery observations from March and April 1979, while Furukawa independently found earlier prediscovery observations from April 1933. With these prediscovery observations linked, the asteroid's orbit was significantly improved and eventually received its permanent minor planet number of 4337 from the Minor Planet Center on 11 January 1990.

Naming 
The asteroid was named after the Arecibo Observatory in Puerto Rico, home to the world's largest filled-aperature radio telescope in the 20th century. The name was proposed by radar astronomer Steven J. Ostro, in recognition of the observatory's indispensable contributions to the characterization of Solar System bodies including asteroids. The official naming citation was published by the Minor Planet Center on 8 June 1990.

Occultations and satellite discovery 
On 19 May 2021, two amateur astronomers, David Gault and Peter Nosworthy, observed Arecibo passing in front of a magnitude 13.6 star and blocking out its light from New South Wales, Australia. They detected a two-second-long occultation starting at 17:58 UTC, but then unexpectedly detected a secondary, shorter-duration occultation three seconds later. The observed drop in the star's brightness for both events was much greater than would be expected for a double star with one component occulted, leading Gault and Nosworthy to the conclusion that the secondary occultation was more likely caused by a natural satellite orbiting Arecibo.
 
Several days after the discovery of Arecibo's satellite, other occultation astronomers were alerted to follow up in another occultation event by Arecibo over North America on 9 June 2021. As Arecibo passed in front of a magnitude 12.0 star, they detected the primary two-second-long occultation starting at 10:58 UTC and then the satellite make a secondary occultation three seconds later, confirming the existence of Arecibo's satellite. The satellite discovery and confirmation results from the May and June 2021 occultations were formally published by Central Bureau for Astronomical Telegrams on 20 June 2021. Discoverers Gault and Nosworthy recognize Arecibo's satellite as the first asteroid moon discovered by amateur astronomers, and confirmed using the occultation method.

On 30 June 2021, astronomers across the United States prepared for another occultation by Arecibo to further follow up on its satellite, but majority of them experienced technical difficulties and unfavorable weather conditions, resulting in only 5 out of 15 different sites making successful observations. Only 3 of the 5 successful sites reported positive detections (Nolthenius, Bender, and Christopher Kitting of CSU East Bay reported positives) with a single occultation; the other two had misses and did not detect the satellite. It is possible the satellite and main body were a blended image, given the close orbit later determined.

Orbit and classification 
Arecibo is a Themistian asteroid that belongs to the Themis family, a very large family of carbonaceous asteroids named after their parent body 24 Themis. Arecibo orbits the Sun in the outer main-belt at a distance of 3.0–3.6 AU once every 5 years and 11 months (2,156 days; semi-major axis of 3.27 AU). Its orbit has an eccentricity of 0.09 and an inclination of 2° with respect to the ecliptic.

Because of its low orbital inclination, Arecibo is visible along the ecliptic at apparent magnitudes 16–18. Arecibo is too faint to be seen with the naked eye, even when at its peak brightness of magnitude 16 at opposition—a telescope of at least  in aperture size is required to see it.

Physical characteristics 
The spectral class of Arecibo is unknown, but it can be assumed to be a carbonaceous C-type, similar to most members of the Themis family. Like most members of the Themis family, Arecibo likely has a highly porous internal structure with a low density below , which is indeed implied by its mass determined from the satellite's orbital motion.

Diameter and albedo 
Based on occultation observations from 9 June 2021, the primary body of the Arecibo system measures  in diameter, assuming that it has a spherical shape. The discrepancy between the occultation and infrared measurements may be caused by a highly flattened shape for both components of the Arecibo system; in this case the occultation-derived primary diameter would represent the maximum extent of its shape. WISE's estimates for Arecibo's absolute magnitude range from 11.9 to 12.6, with an average of 12.4 assumed by the Collaborative Asteroid Lightcurve Link. The Minor Planet Center and Jet Propulsion Laboratory's Small-Body Database both determine an absolute magnitude of 12.5 based on visible photometry only.

Rotation 
In July 2021, a preliminary rotational lightcurve of Arecibo was obtained from photometric observations by Swiss astronomer Raoul Behrend at Geneva Observatory in Switzerland. Lightcurve analysis gave an approximate rotation period of  hours with a brightness amplitude of 0.17 magnitude (U=2). High-precision photometry and astrometry from the Gaia spacecraft confirmed this period and showed that it is equal to the satellite's orbital period, suggesting that the Arecibo primary is in synchronous rotation with the satellite's orbital period.

Based on Gaia photometry, Arecibo's north pole points in the direction of ecliptic longitude 271° and ecliptic latitude 68°. Gaia astrometry for the satellite's orbit yields a pole orientation of ecliptic longitude  and ecliptic latitude , in agreement with the photometry-derived pole orientation. This suggests the axial tilt of Arecibo primary is aligned with the satellite's orbital inclination at 30° with respect to the ecliptic.

Satellite 

Arecibo hosts a relatively large minor-planet moon with a size about half its diameter, forming a binary system. It was discovered by Australian amateur astronomers David Gault and Peter Nosworthy while observing Arecibo occulting a star on 19 May 2021, and was confirmed in another occultation on 9 June 2021.

Orbit 
Because no photometric measurements of Arecibo's rotation period were available at that time, constraints on the satellite's orbital period were solely limited to the three occultations observed in 2021, which suggested periods of 20 days and its shorter-period aliases of 10 days, 5 days, and 2.5 days.

On 13 June 2022, a team of European astronomers led by Paolo Tanga, on behalf of the European Space Agency, published a proof-of-concept analysis of the Arecibo system using high-precision astrometry and photometry from the Gaia mission, as part of its third data release. Given the satellite's close proximity to the primary body and coincidence of brightness and position oscillation periods, the satellite is likely in synchronous orbit with the primary's rotation period.

Physical characteristics 

The initial detection of the satellite in the 19 May 2021 occultation provided poor constraints on its size due to close spacing between the observers' sites. Given this diameter estimate, this makes the satellite about half the size of the primary body in the Arecibo system.

The satellite is massive enough to induce measurable positional wobbling of the Arecibo primary, although with an unexpectedly low amplitude of up to 2.7 milliarcseconds from Gaia'''s view, or 8.5% of the maximum observed angular separation between the satellite and primary. This small positional wobbling of the Arecibo primary implies a very low satellite-to-primary mass ratio relative to the satellite-to-primary diameter ratio, which could either be explained by a highly flattened shape or a very low density for the satellite. Tanga and collaborators favor the high flattening scenario as it yields more realistic density values and can explain the infrared underestimation of the primary's diameter. In this case, the occultation-derived satellite diameter would represent its maximum shape extent and its minimum possible density would be , expected for a highly porous Themistian asteroid.

 Notes 

 References 

 External links 
 Barry, Tony. "4337 Arecibo - a possible binary asteroid?". Western Sydney Amateur Astronomy Group. 20 May 2021.
 Johnston, Wm. Robert. "(4337) Arecibo" Asteroids with Satellites Database''. Johnston's Archive. 30 April 2022.
 
 

004337
Discoveries by Edward L. G. Bowell
Named minor planets
004337
004337
19850414